Bryan Robert Harvey (26 August 1938 — 31 March 2006) was a professional footballer who played as a goalkeeper for Newcastle United, Blackpool, and Northampton Town.  He also had a spell with Southern League Cambridge City from August 1961 to February 1962.

Harvey moved to Northampton Town in October 1963 and went on to make 181 appearances for the Cobblers. In the 1964–65 season, his second season at the club, he was a mainstay in the team that finished runner-up and one point behind champions, former club Newcastle United. He also saved seven penalties during the season, including two in one match against Southampton, which were taken by Terry Paine, England's penalty taker at the time.

References

External links
Bryan Harvey at barryhugmansfootballers

English footballers
English Football League players
Association football goalkeepers
Newcastle United F.C. players
Blackpool F.C. players
Northampton Town F.C. players
1938 births
2006 deaths
Footballers from Stepney